Emerging is a 1985 Australian TV movie about a paraplegic.

References

External links

Emerging at ABC

1985 television films
1985 films
Australian drama television films
Films about paraplegics or quadriplegics
1985 drama films
Films directed by Kathy Mueller
1980s English-language films